The 2011–12 Russian National Football League the 20th season of Russia's second-tier football league since the dissolution of the Soviet Union. The season began on 4 April.

Overview

FC Zhemchuzhina-Sochi officially withdrew from the competition on 7 August 2011 due to lack of financing. Because they played more than half of their games, all their remaining opponents will be awarded a 3–0 victory.

Managerial changes

First phase

Standings

Results

Second phase

Promotion Group

Standings

Results

Relegation Group

Standings

Results

Top scorers
Source: Onedivision.ru 
31 goals
  Ruslan Mukhametshin (Mordovia)
22 goals
  Dmitri Golubov (Baltika / Dynamo)
20 goals
  Dmitri Akimov (Sibir)
16 goals
  Maksim Astafyev (Sibir)
15 goals
  Kirill Panchenko (Mordovia)
14 goals
  Artyom Delkin (Torpedo Vladimir)
  Eldar Nizamutdinov (Shinnik)

See also
2011–12 Russian Premier League

References

External links
Official website

2
Russian First League seasons
Rus